The International Ornithological Committee (IOC) recognizes these 96 species of nightjars and allies in the family Caprimulgidae. The species are distributed among 20 genera, a few of which have only one member. One extinct species, the Jamaican poorwill, is included.

This list is presented according to the IOC taxonomic sequence and can also be sorted alphabetically by common name and binomial.

References

Caprimulgiformes
Nightjar